Pholistoma membranaceum is a species of flowering plant in the borage family which is known by the common name white fiesta flower.

It is native to western North America from central California to Baja California. It can be found in many types of habitat from mountain ravines to beaches to desert scrub generally below  elevation.

Description
Pholistoma membranaceum is an annual herb with a waxy, fleshy, bristly stem up to 90 centimeters long and branching profusely, sometimes forming a tangle. The leaves are deeply lobed or cut and borne on winged petioles. The foliage is coated in hairs.

The inflorescence consists of cymes of 2 to 10 flowers each under a centimeter wide. The flower is white, usually with a purple spot or streak on each of its five lobes.

References

External links

Pholistoma membranaceum — UC Photo gallery

Hydrophylloideae
Flora of California
Flora of Baja California
Flora of the California desert regions
Flora of the Sierra Nevada (United States)
Flora of the Sonoran Deserts
Natural history of the California chaparral and woodlands
Natural history of the Central Valley (California)
Natural history of the Colorado Desert
Natural history of the Mojave Desert
Natural history of the Peninsular Ranges
Natural history of the Transverse Ranges
Flora without expected TNC conservation status